Boddington, sometimes referred to as Boddingtons, was a merchant ship launched in 1781 on the River Thames. For the first decade of her career she sailed as a West Indiaman. She made one voyage in 1792 transporting convicts from  Ireland to Australia. For her return trip she also made one voyage for the East India Company from Asia to Britain. She wrecked in 1805 on the Thames River.

Career
Boddington was launched on the Thames for Boddington, who employed her sailing between London and Nevis. She first appeared in Lloyd's Register (LR) in 1781.

Under the command of Captain Robert Chalmers, Boddington sailed from Cork, Ireland, on 15 February 1792, with 125 male and 20 female convicts. During the voyage Chalmers suppressed a mutiny by the convicts. She arrived at Port Jackson, New South Wales on 7 August 1793. One male convict died on the voyage. She left Port Jackson in October 1793 for Bengal, in company with Sugar Cane.

Between 1793 and 1795 Boddington made one trip for the East India Company from Penang to Britain. She apparently was in Bengal prior to arriving at Penang. Lloyd's List reported that "The Boddingtons, Chalmers, from Bengal to London, met with bad weather which obliged her to put into Prince of Wales Island, where she has been refitted, and was to proceed under Convoy of the Bombay frigate." Boddington left Penang on 11 November 1794 and reached St Helena on 27 February 1795. She then arrived at Long Reach on 5 August.

Fate
The Register of Shipping for 1805 gave the name of Boddingtons master as Wright, and her trade as London—Jamaica.

During the night of 11 September 1805, Boddington was one of a number of ships that came adrift from the mooring chain whilst waiting to enter the West India Dock. She stranded in the Thames off Blackwall on a sandbank, sank, and was wrecked. On 13 September 1805, Lloyd's List reported that "The Bodingtons, Wright, from Jamaica, is on Shore near Blackwall, and full of Water."

Notes

Citations

References
 
 

1781 ships
Ships built on the River Thames
Ships of the British East India Company
Shipwrecks of the River Thames
Maritime incidents in 1805
Convict ships to New South Wales
Age of Sail merchant ships
Merchant ships of the United Kingdom